Cora benitoana is a species of basidiolichen in the family Hygrophoraceae. Found in Mexico, it was formally described as a new species in 2019 by Bibiana Moncada, Rosa Emilia Pérez-Pérez, and Robert Lücking. The specific epithet honours Benito Pablo Juárez García, Mexican President from the state of Oaxaca.

It usually grows over mosses and liverworts, particularly from the genus Frullania.

References

benitoana
Lichen species
Lichens described in 2019
Lichens of Mexico
Taxa named by Robert Lücking
Basidiolichens